|}

The Superlative Stakes is a Group 2 flat horse race in Great Britain open to two-year-old horses. It is run on the July Course at Newmarket over a distance of 7 furlongs (1,408 metres), and it is scheduled to take place each year in July.

History
The event was formerly known as the Bernard van Cutsem Stakes. It was named in memory of Bernard van Cutsem, a successful racehorse trainer who died in 1975.

The race was renamed the Superlative Stakes in 1991 to honour Superlative, a splendidly tough two-year-old in 1983, trained by Bill O'Gorman and owned by Mrs Poh-Lian Yong, who won the July Stakes and Flying Childers Stakes, and 'reached the frame' in three Group 1 contests - Prix Robert Papin(2nd), Middle Park Stakes(2nd), Dewhurst Stakes(4th).

For a period the Superlative Stakes held Listed status. It was upgraded to Group 3 level in 2003, and to Group 2 in 2006. It is currently staged on the final day of Newmarket's three-day July Festival meeting.

Records

Leading jockey since 1986 (4 wins):
 Steve Cauthen – Suhailie (1986), Samoan (1988), Be My Chief (1989), Hokusai (1990)
 Pat Eddery – Undercut (1987), Ardkinglass (1992), Bal Harbour (1993), Allied Forces (1995)
 Richard Hughes – Redback (2001), Kings Point (2003), King Torus (2010), Olympic Glory (2012)

Leading trainer since 1986 (9 wins):
 Henry Cecil – Suhailie (1986), Samoan (1988), Be My Chief (1989), Hokusai (1990), Ardkinglass (1992), Bal Harbour (1993), Allied Forces (1995), Baltic State (1997), Vacamonte (2000)

Winners since 1986

See also
 Horse racing in Great Britain
 List of British flat horse races

References

 Paris-Turf: 
 Racing Post:
 galopp-sieger.de – Superlative Stakes.
 ifhaonline.org – International Federation of Horseracing Authorities – Superlative Stakes (2019).
 pedigreequery.com – Superlative Stakes – Newmarket.

Flat races in Great Britain
Newmarket Racecourse
Flat horse races for two-year-olds